Chugqênsumdo (Tibetan: དྲུག་ཆེན་སུམ་མདོ་, Wylie: drug chen sum mdo; Chinese: 智青松多, Pinyin: Zhìqīngsōngduō) is a town in Jigzhi County, Golog Tibetan Autonomous Prefecture, Qinghai, China. The seat of Jigzhi County is located in Chugqênsumdo. Chugqênsumdo has an altitude of 3630 meters.

Originally known as Kangsar (Kangsai) Township (Tibetan: ཁང་གསར་, Chinese: 康赛乡), Chugqênsumdo Town was renamed in 2001. In 2016, Chugqênsumdo had a population of approximately 4000. Chugqênsumdo is accessible through National Highway 345 and Provincial Highway 101.

References 

Populated places in Qinghai
Township-level divisions of Qinghai
Golog Tibetan Autonomous Prefecture